Phyllis Jeanne Somerville (December 12, 1943 – July 16, 2020) was an American stage, film, and television actress. She is best known for her roles in Little Children (2006), The Curious Case of Benjamin Button (2008), Surviving Family (2012), The Big C (2010–2013), and Outsiders (2016–2017).

Personal life
Somerville was born in Iowa City, Iowa, to Lefa Mary (née Pash; 1918–2011) and the Rev. Paul Somerville (1919-1995), who moved the family around as he preached at different churches, until settling in Traer, and eventually Cresco, Iowa. There, her mother worked as a librarian, and Phyllis attended high school, where she was involved with cheerleading, drama, and music, including playing clarinet in the All-State band. She had three brothers: Paul, (Clinical social worker MBA) (1947–2005), and Stephen, (Naval officer, Forensic pathologist.) And Bruce (Artist) 

She attended Morningside College and then transferred to the University of Northern Iowa, studying theatre and graduating with a degree in English in 1966. In college, she starred in productions such as The Visit, Electra, and Macbeth. She next did graduate work performing classical roles such as Puck in A Midsummer Night's Dream at the Hilberry Theatre through Wayne State University in Detroit and later became a resident equity actress with the Arena Stage in Washington, DC. Her first paid job as an entertainer was at Buckskin Joe amusement park over summer break in college.

She lived in New York City, where she died in 2020, aged 76, of natural causes.

Theatre
Somerville made her Broadway debut as Wilma in the 1974 musical Over Here!, which was nominated for the Tony Award for Best Musical. The following year, she performed in the off-Broadway musical The Journey of Snow White as the Witch. She appeared in the 1978 Broadway production of Once in a Lifetime. In 1983, she was the understudy for Kathy Bates in the Broadway production of Marsha Norman's 'night, Mother, and later toured in the role opposite Mercedes McCambridge. In 1984, she originated the role of Glory in Norman's next play, Traveler in the Dark, at the American Repertory Theater.

In 1990, she originated the role of Joyce in The Sum of Us by David Stevens. In 2001, she originated the role of Hannah in the off-Broadway musical The Spitfire Grill, a role played in the 1996 film by Ellen Burstyn. In 2009, she performed in the musical Happiness at the Lincoln Center Theatre. She has appeared in other productions off-Broadway, as well as in regional theatre, including many roles with the Hartford Stage Company. She was a member of the LAByrinth Theater Company. In 2014, she appeared off-Broadway in an experimental all-female production of I Remember Mama, alongside Rita Gardner, Heather MacRae, and Barbara Barrie.

Filmography

Film

Television

Podcasts

Awards and nominations

References

External links
 
 
 

American people of English descent
1943 births
2020 deaths 
20th-century American actresses
21st-century American actresses
Actresses from Iowa
American film actresses
American stage actresses
American television actresses
Actors from Iowa City, Iowa
Morningside University alumni
University of Northern Iowa alumni
People from Tama County, Iowa
People from Cresco, Iowa